"Mírala Bien" is a song by Puerto Rican reggaeton duo Wisin & Yandel. It was released in 2005 by Machete Music and served as the second single of their fourth studio album, Pa'l Mundo (2005).The song has been mention in numerous articles as it is one of the duo's best songs. They still perform this song in concerts.

Music video
The video clip begins with a woman walking down a street, and then Yandel begins to sing while that woman is seen in a car. In Wisin's rapping, he is accompanied by women with a choreography. Yandel is also shown with a woman, caressing her. In the middle of the video, until the end, Wisin & Yandel begin to interpret the song, around cars, people, and the women that are dancing. The video appears on the DVD of the deluxe edition of Pa'l Mundo along with a behind the scenes look of the making of the video. It was directed by David Impelluso.

Charts

References

2005 singles
Wisin & Yandel songs
2005 songs
Machete Music singles
Songs written by Yandel
Songs written by Wisin